Wesley de Ruiter (born 13 January 1986) is a Dutch professional footballer who plays as a goalkeeper.

Career
Born in Leiden, de Ruiter has played for FC Utrecht, FC Den Bosch, Excelsior, RKC Waalwijk and FC Emmen.

References

1986 births
Living people
Dutch footballers
FC Utrecht players
FC Den Bosch players
Excelsior Rotterdam players
RKC Waalwijk players
FC Emmen players
Eredivisie players
Eerste Divisie players
Association football goalkeepers
Footballers from Leiden